Sir James Bond, 1st Baronet (11 June 1744 – 2 June 1820) was an Irish Member of Parliament of Anglo-Irish descent.

He was the son of the Rev. James Bond (died 1762), a minister at Corboy in County Longford by his wife Catherine, daughter of the Rev. Thomas Wensley, of Lifford, County Donegal. On 27 July 1770 he was married to Anne Hornby, the daughter William Hornby, who would later serve as Governor of Bombay; they had several children and died on 3 July 1809. Bond sat in the Irish House of Commons as Member for Naas from 1790 to 1797, and on 21 January 1794 he was created a baronet, of Coolamber in County Longford, in the Baronetage of Ireland. At his death the baronetcy was inherited by his second son, Thomas, as his eldest, James Hornby Bond, had died in 1792.

References

 

1744 births
1820 deaths
18th-century Anglo-Irish people
19th-century Anglo-Irish people
Baronets in the Baronetage of Ireland
Irish MPs 1790–1797
Members of the Parliament of Ireland (pre-1801) for County Kildare constituencies